This is a list of groups involved in Railway preservation in New Zealand.

Members of the Federation of Rail Organisations New Zealand

Members of the Federation of Rail Organisations of New Zealand: Railway museums, heritage lines, societies, clubs, trusts, etc., in New Zealand. This also include model engineering clubs and narrow gauge railways.

North Island
Northland

Bay of Islands Vintage Railway Charitable Trust
Whangarei Steam & Model Railway Club
Whangarei Model Engineering Club

Auckland
Mainline Steam
Glenbrook Vintage Railway
Railway Enthusiasts Society
The Waitakere Tramline Society
Watercare Services
Western Springs Railway Museum of Transport and Technology
Western Springs Tramway Museum of Transport and Technology
Auckland Society of Model Engineers Incorporated
Manukau Live Steamers

Waikato / Coromandel
Bush Tramway Club
DF 1501 Restoration Charitable Trust
Driving Creek Railway
Goldfields Railway
Victoria Battery Tramway Society
Te Aroha Mountain Railway
Thames Small Gauge Railway Society
Hamilton Model Engineers
Cambridge Model Engineering Society Inc
Waihi Small Gauge Railway

Bay of Plenty

Rotorua - Ngongotaha Rail Trust
Geyserland Express Trust
Tauranga Model Marine and Engineering Club
Eastern Bay of Plenty Model Engineering Society

East Cape / Hawke's Bay

East Coast Museum of Technology
Gisborne City Vintage Railway
Hawkes Bay Steam Society
 Ormondville Rail Preservation Group
Hawkes Bay Model Engineering Society
Havelock North Live Steamers & Associates

Taranaki
Hooterville Heritage Charitable Trust(No longer operating)
Pioneer Village Soc Inc
Waitara Railway Preservation Society
New Plymouth Society of Model & Experimental Engineers

Wairarapa

Friends of the Fell Society Fell Engine Museum Featherston
Pahiatua Railcar Society
Wairarapa Railway Restoration Society, based at the Carterton railway station

Manawatu

Feilding and District Steam Rail Society
Steamrail Wanganui Incorporated
Palmerston North Model Engineering Club Inc
Esplanade Scenic Railway

Wellington

Craven Crane Preservation Group
Department of Conservation
Mainline Steam
New Zealand Railway and Locomotive Society (or see website)
Rail Heritage Trust of New Zealand
Rimutaka Incline Railway Heritage Trust
Silver Stream Railway
Steam Incorporated (Engine Shed - Paekakariki)
Wellington and Manawatu Railway Trust
Wellington Tramway Museum (or see website)
Paekakariki Station Precinct Trust
Wellington CableCar Museum
Kapiti Miniature Railway & Model Engineering Society Inc
Featherston Miniature Fell Society
Maidstone Model Engineering Society
Hutt Valley Model Engineering Society

South Island

Nelson / Marlborough

Blenheim Riverside Railway
Nelson Railway Society (Founders Heritage Park)
Picton Society of Model Engineers
Marlborough Associated Modellers Society
Nelson Society of Modellers

Westland

Charming Creek Railway
Reefton Historic Trust Board
West Coast Historical & Mechanical Society, Shantytown
 Westport Railway Preservation Society

Canterbury

Mainline Steam
Ashburton Railway & Preservation Society
Canterbury Railway Society (Ferrymead Railway)
Canterbury Steam Preservation Society (McLeans Island Steamscene)
Christchurch Tramway Ltd
Diesel Traction Group
Heritage Tramways Trust
Midland Rail Heritage Trust
Midland Railway Company (NZ) Ltd
National Railway Museum of New Zealand
Pleasant Point Museum and Railway
 Tramway Historical Society (Ferrymead Tramway)
Weka Pass Railway
Canterbury Society of Model & Experimental Engineers
Christchurch Live Steamers
Ashburton Steam Model & Engineering Club
South Canterbury Model Engineers

Otago

Oamaru Steam and Railway Restoration Society 
Otago Excursion Train Trust (part owners of Dunedin Railways)
Otago Railway & Locomotive Society (Ocean Beach Railway)
Project Steam (Dunedin) Inc
The Otago Model Engineering Society
Otago Miniature Road & Rail Society Inc

Southland

Ohai Railway Board Heritage Trust
Gore Model Engineering Club
Southland Society of Model Engineers

Cook Islands

 Rarotonga Steam Railway in Cook Islands

Other organisations
Kingston Flyer
Ferrymead Heritage Park
RM 133 Trust
Otago Settlers Museum has two steam engines on display

See also

List of museums in New Zealand

References

External links
 Federation of Rail Organisations New Zealand website

Lists of heritage railways
Railway museums
Museums and heritage lines

Lists of railway museums